Sabina of Brandenburg-Ansbach (12 May 1529 – 2 November 1575) was a princess of Brandenburg-Ansbach and Electress of Brandenburg by marriage.

Life 
Sabina was the daughter of George, Margrave of Brandenburg-Ansbach (1484–1543) from his second marriage to Hedwig of Münsterberg-Oels (1508–1531), daughter of the Duke Charles I of Münsterberg-Oels. The princess was brought up by her stepmother Emilie of Saxony in the Lutheran faith.

On 12 February 1548 Sabina married Elector John George of Brandenburg (1525–1598) in Ansbach.  His first wife Sophie of Legnica was Sabina's cousin.  The day before the wedding ceremony, she solemnly renounced her possible paternal inheritance.  The district, city and castle of Plauen were made over to her as her Wittum.  Since Plauen, like all districts of Brandenburg, was not free of debt, lengthy negotiations about the compensation for her dowry of 12,000 guilders led to the district and monastery of Spandau also being assigned to her.

Sabina's husband was heir apparent to the Electorate of Brandenburg for 23 years.  The couple spent this time on various castles in the territories of Brandenburg.  The family's official residence was Zechlin castle in Rheinsberg near Wittstock.  Here Sabina cared for her own children and also for her stepson Joachim Friedrich, who later became Elector of Brandenburg.  Sabina's thrifty life style caused Rheinsberg to prosper for a while.

After Sabina's husband became Elector in 1571, she had an influence on religious affairs and was a patron of churches and schools.  She supported the sick and the poor and had regular personal contact with the doctor Leonhard Thurneysser.

Sabina died on 2 November 1575 and was buried in the Berlin Cathedral.

Offspring 
From her marriage Sabina had the following children:
 George Albert (19 February 1555 – 8 January 1557)
 John (1557 – died young), twin with Albert
 Albert (1557 – died young), twin with John
 Magdalena Sabina (1559 – died young)
 Erdmuthe (26 June 1561 – 13 November 1623), married in 1577 to Duke John Frederick of Pomerania
 Marie (1562 – died young)
 Hedwig (1563 – died young)
 Magdalena (1564 – died young)
 Margaret (1565 – died young)
 Anna Maria (3 February 1567 – 4 November 1618), married in 1581 to Duke Barnim X of Pomerania
 Sophie (6 June 1568 – 7 December 1622), married in 1582 to Elector Christian I of Saxony

Notes

References 
 Daniel Martin Ernst Kirchner, The princesses and queens on the throne of the Hohenzollerns, Part 2: The last eight princesses, Berlin 1867, p. 4-31.

|-

1529 births
1575 deaths
Electresses of Brandenburg
House of Hohenzollern
Electoral Princesses of Brandenburg
Burials at Berlin Cathedral
Daughters of monarchs